Burbiškis Manor may refer to:

 Burbiškis Manor (Anykščiai)
 Burbiškis Manor (Radviliškis)